Jacques Mouton (born 1888, date of death unknown) was a Belgian sports shooter. He competed in the team clay pigeon event at the 1924 Summer Olympics.

References

External links
 

1888 births
Year of death missing
Belgian male sport shooters
Olympic shooters of Belgium
Shooters at the 1924 Summer Olympics
Place of birth missing